Three-time defending champion Martina Navratilova successfully defended her title, defeating Hana Mandlíková in the final, 6–2, 6–0, 3–6, 6–2 to win the singles tennis title at the March edition of the 1986 Virginia Slims Championships. It was her seventh Tour Finals singles title.

Seeds

  Martina Navratilova (champion)
  Chris Evert  (semifinals)
  Steffi Graf (semifinals)
  Claudia Kohde-Kilsch (quarterfinals)
  Hana Mandlíková (final)
  Pam Shriver (quarterfinals)
  Helena Suková (quarterfinals)
  Manuela Maleeva (first round)

Draw

See also
WTA Tour Championships appearances

References

 1986 Virginia Slims Championships (March) Draw

Singles 1986
Singles